Pilsbryspira cinerea is a species of sea snail, a marine gastropod mollusk in the family Pseudomelatomidae, the turrids and allies.

Description
The length of the shell attains 20 mm.

Distribution
This species occurs off the West Indies off Martinique.

References

 Weinkauff H.C., continued by Kobelt W. (1875-1887). Die Familie Pleurotomidae. Systematisches Conchylien-Cabinet von Martini und Chemnitz. Vol. 4. Bauer & Raspe, Nürnberg, 248 pp., pls A, 1–42

External links
 
 Gastropods.com: Pilsbryspira cinerea

cinerea
Gastropods described in 1876